Kreisel is a surname. Notable people with the surname include:

 Franz Kreisel, hockey
 Georg Kreisel, logician
 Henry Kreisel, writer
 Uwe Kreisel
 Howard Kreisel, professor of medieval Jewish philosophy

See also 
 Kreisel, a turn found on some bobsleigh, luge, and skeleton tracks
 Kreisler (disambiguation)
 Krisel (disambiguation)

German-language surnames